John David Swift (born 23 June 1995) is an English professional footballer who plays as an attacking midfielder for EFL Championship club West Bromwich Albion.

Early life
John David Swift was born on 23 June 1995 in Portsmouth, Hampshire.

Club career

Early years
A midfielder, Swift began his career at Soccer City in Fareham, before moving to Kickers in Eastleigh. He joined local Premier League club Portsmouth in 2005, but was released after just one season. He joined Chandler's Ford Tornadoes, before spending six months with Premier League club Chelsea as an U13. Upon his release he joined Pace Youth in Southampton After interest from Fulham, Portsmouth and
Southampton, Swift rejoined Chelsea after a successful trial in 2007.

Chelsea

Youth years
While still an U15, Swift made his U18 debut during the 2009–10 season. He was a part of the U15 team's success in the Junior Section of the 2010 Milk Cup, scoring in a 3–0 victory over Cruz Azul in the final. Swift signed a scholarship deal at the end of the 2010–11 season and was part of the U18 team which won the 2011–12 FA Youth Cup. He made his U21 debut towards the end of the 2011–12 season and was awarded a four-year professional contract in July 2012. Swift alternated between the U18, U19 and U21 teams during the 2012–13 season and he cemented a place in the U21s the following year, scoring 9 goals in 26 appearances and winning the U21 Premier League title.

Senior
Swift began training with the first team in the latter stages of the 2013–14 season and was rewarded for his form with the U21s by being named as a substitute for the final match of the campaign versus Cardiff City. He made his professional debut when he replaced Eden Hazard in the dying minutes of the 2–1 victory. Swift spent the majority of the 2014–15 season away on loan and did not receive a first team call up.

Loan to Rotherham United
On 1 August 2014, Swift joined newly promoted Championship side Rotherham United on loan for the duration of the 2014–15 season. He made his debut as a substitute on the opening day of the season in a 1–0 away defeat to Derby County, replacing Matt Derbyshire after 70 minutes. He made his first start for the Millers in the following match versus Fleetwood Town in the League Cup first round, lasting 66 minutes of the extra time victory before being replaced by Matt Derbyshire. After two further appearances, Swift was consigned to the bench until 14 November, when he returned to Chelsea after failing to "make a significant impact" at the New York Stadium. He made just four appearances for the club.

Loan to Swindon Town
On 3 January 2015, Swift joined high-flying League One club Swindon Town on loan until the end of the 2014–15 season. He began his time at the County Ground by making five consecutive starts and he scored his first professional goal on his third appearance, in a 3–1 victory over Chesterfield. He netted again on 7 March, sending the Robins on their way to a 3–0 victory over Notts County. A fourth-place finish saw Swindon qualify for the promotion playoffs, but Swift made just one appearance in the semi-final first leg versus Sheffield United, picking up a muscle strain, which saw him ruled out of the victorious second leg and the final defeat to Preston North End. He made 19 appearances and scored two goals for Swindon.

Loan to Brentford
On 1 October 2015, Swift joined Championship side Brentford on a loan which was later extended until the end of the 2015–16 season. He made his debut two days later as a second-half substitute for Toumani Diagouraga during a 2–0 defeat to Derby County. Deployed as a right winger, Swift replaced Konstantin Kerschbaumer in the starting lineup for the following match versus former side Rotherham United and scored his first goal for the Bees with the opener in a 3–0 win over Charlton Athletic on 24 October. He became a regular starter and scored the first brace of his career to send the Bees on the way to a 3–0 win over Wolverhampton Wanderers on 23 February 2016, subsequently being named in the Football League Team of Midweek. After overcoming an achilles injury suffered on international duty, he scored his seventh goal of the season in a 5–1 rout of Huddersfield Town on the final day. Swift made 28 appearances during the season and returned to Stamford Bridge.

Reading
Swift signed a three-year contract, with the option of an additional year, with Reading on 14 July 2016. He scored on his Reading debut in a 1–0 win over Preston North End on 6 August 2016.

On 27 March 2017, Swift was nominated for the EFL Young Player of the Year award along with Ryan Ledson and Ollie Watkins.

On 31 July 2017, Swift signed a new five-year contract with Reading, keeping him at the club until 2022. On 11 September 2021, he scored a hat-trick, in a 3–3 draw against Queens Park Rangers.

West Brom

Swift signed a three-year contract with West Bromwich Albion on 26 May 2022 on a free transfer. On 30 July 2022, he made his competitive debut and scored the equalizing goal in a 1-1 draw against Middlesbrough in the opening game of the championship season.

International career

Swift has represented England from U16 through to U21 level. He made his international debut in a Victory Shield defeat to Wales U16 on 15 October 2010. He was part of the U17 squad which won the 2011 FA International Tournament and the 2012 Algarve Tournament, but he could not help the team to qualify for the 2012 European U17 Championship. Swift made 9 appearances during the U19s' failed qualification attempts for the 2013 and 2014 European U19 Championships. Moving up to U20 level for the 2014–15 season, Swift was a part of the squad which won the 2014 Four Nation Tournament and he finally scored his first international goal with the opener in a 2–1 victory over United States U20 on 29 March 2015. Swift was called into the U20 squad for the 2015 Toulon Tournament and appeared in all of England's matches as the Young Lions finished fourth. In November 2015, Swift made his U21 debut with a start in a 3–1 2017 European U21 Championship qualifying win over Switzerland. On 25 August 2016, he was called up for Gareth Southgate's U21 side to face Norway in a UEFA U21 Euro 2017 qualifier.

Personal life
Swift attended Brune Park school in Gosport and lived in the town until the age of 16.

Career statistics

Honours
England U17
FA International U17 Tournament: 2011
Algarve Tournament: 2012

England U20
Four Nation Tournament: 2014

England U21
Toulon Tournament: 2016

References

External links

 John Swift profile at chelseafc.com
 John Swift profile at TheFA.com
 
 

1995 births
Living people
Footballers from Portsmouth
English footballers
England youth international footballers
England under-21 international footballers
Association football midfielders
Chelsea F.C. players
Rotherham United F.C. players
Swindon Town F.C. players
Brentford F.C. players
Reading F.C. players
Premier League players
English Football League players